Raison d'être  is a French expression commonly used in English, meaning "reason for being" or "reason to be".

Raison d'être may refer to:

Music
 Raison d'être (band), a Swedish dark-ambient-industrial-drone music project
 Raison D'être (album), an album by Australian jazz fusion guitarist Frank Gambale

Songs
 "Raison d'etre", a song by Asriel (band) from the album Abyss
 "raison detre", a song by Japanese rock band Dir En Grey on the album Gauze
 "Raison d'etre", a song by Japanese rock band Nightmare used as opening theme of the anime Claymore
 "Raison d'être", a song used as the ending theme of the Chobits anime by Japanese singer and voice actress Rie Tanaka
 "Raison d'etre", a song by British rock band Buzzcocks from the album A Different Kind of Tension
 "Raison d'être～交差する宿命～", a song by Tomosuke Funaki under the alias Zektbach for the arcade game beatmania IIDX 17: Sirius
 "Raison d'être~レーゾンデートル~", a song by Japanese singer Eve from the album Smile

Other
 Raison d'être, an American Ale brewed by Dogfish Head